Edmond Akhtar is a retired Iranian-Armenian football player.

Career
In 1991, Akhtar started his career with Ararat Tehran of the Azadegan League. After spending several years with the team, Akhtar transferred to Tehran based side Esteghlal F.C. While at the club, Akhtar became a fan favorite, leading the team in scoring and becoming one of the top scorers in the 1994–95 season. After spending several successful seasons with the team, Akhtar moved to Pas Tehran F.C. in 2000. Spending only one season with the team, Akhtar retired. He attempted a comeback in 2006, signing with second division side Sanati Kaveh F.C.

International
Akhtar's success as a member of Esteghlal F.C. earned him several caps with Iranian national football team. In 1996, he made his international debut against Turkmenistan. Akhtar scored his first goal several games later, notching an equalizer for Iran against the Kuwait national football team.

References

External sources
 Profile at Team Milli

Living people
Sportspeople from Tehran
Ethnic Armenian sportspeople
Iranian footballers
Iranian people of Armenian descent
Iran international footballers
F.C. Ararat Tehran players
Esteghlal F.C. players
Sanati Kaveh players
Pas players
Azadegan League players
Association football forwards
1972 births